Amphimallon assimile is a species of beetle in the Melolonthinae subfamily that can be found in France and Italy.

References

Beetles described in 1790
assimile
Beetles of Europe